Diagonal Norte is a station on Line C of the Buenos Aires Underground.  From here, passengers may transfer to Carlos Pellegrini Station on Line B or 9 de Julio Station on Line D and Metrobus 9 de Julio. It is located near the Obelisco de Buenos Aires.

The station was opened on 9 November 1934 as the western terminus of the inaugural section of the line, from Constitución to Diagonal Norte. On 6 February 1936 the line was extended to Retiro.

Gallery

References

External links

Buenos Aires Underground stations
Railway stations opened in 1934
1934 establishments in Argentina